The Cu Đê River, other name Trường Định River is a river of Da Nang, Vietnam.

References

Rivers of Da Nang
Rivers of Vietnam